Neil James Archibald Primrose  (14 December 1882 – 15 November 1917) was a British Liberal politician and soldier. The second son of Prime Minister Lord Rosebery, he represented Wisbech in parliament from 1910 to 1917 and served as Under-Secretary of State for Foreign Affairs in 1915 and as joint-Parliamentary Secretary to the Treasury from 1916 to 1917. He died from wounds received in action in Palestine in 1917.

Background
Primrose was born at Dalmeny House in Midlothian, Scotland, the second son of Archibald Primrose, 5th Earl of Rosebery, Prime Minister to Queen Victoria from 1894 to 1895, and Hannah de Rothschild, daughter of Baron Mayer de Rothschild. He was the brother of Harry Primrose, 6th Earl of Rosebery and writer Lady Sybil Grant. He was educated at Eton and Oxford and played No.1 for the Oxford Polo team in 1904 and 1905. While at Oxford he was also a keen steeplechase rider.

Political career
Primrose entered the House of Commons at the January 1910 general election as Member of Parliament (MP) for Wisbech. In 1913 he became a member of the Anglo-American Peace Centenary Committee. In February 1915 he was appointed Under-Secretary of State for Foreign Affairs in H. H. Asquith's Liberal administration, but was not offered a post when the coalition government was formed in May of the same year. When David Lloyd George became prime minister in December 1916, Primrose returned to the government as joint-Parliamentary Secretary to the Treasury (government chief whip) alongside Conservative Lord Edmund Talbot, a post he only held until March of the following year. In June 1917 he was sworn of the Privy Council.

Military career

Primrose was commissioned into the Buckinghamshire Yeomanry (Royal Bucks Hussars) in 1909. Promoted Captain in 1915, he was awarded the Military Cross in the King's Birthday Honours of June 1916. He died in November 1917 from wounds received in action at Gezer during the Sinai and Palestine Campaign while leading his squadron of the 1/1st Royal Buckinghamshire Yeomanry against Turkish positions on the Abu Shusheh ridge during the Third Battle of Gaza.

Commemoration
When news of the death of Primrose reached the UK, Prime Minister David Lloyd George paid tribute in the House of Commons on 19 November 1917, alongside his report of the death of Lieutenant General Sir Frederick Stanley Maude:

Responding to the Prime Minister, the former Prime Minister H. H. Asquith (who had himself lost a son in 1916) referred to "two very great national losses" and also paid his respects:

Primrose is buried in the Ramleh Commonwealth War Graves Commission Cemetery at Ramla, in Israel. The inscription on his gravestone reads: HE LIVES BY LOVE. Primrose is commemorated on Panel 8 of the Parliamentary War Memorial in Westminster Hall, one of 22 MPs that died during World War I to be named on that memorial. Primrose is one of 19 MPs who fell in the war who are commemorated by heraldic shields in the Commons Chamber. A further act of commemoration came with the unveiling in 1932 of a manuscript-style illuminated book of remembrance for the House of Commons, which includes a short biographical account of the life and death of Primrose. Memorial tablets were erected by his father in St Giles' Cathedral, Edinburgh, in the Church of St Mary the Virgin, Mentmore, Buckinghamshire, and at Christ Church, Epsom Common, Surrey. Additional memorials were erected to his memory in the form of a stained glass window in St Mary's Church, Knowsley, Merseyside, by his widow's parents, and a further plaque was erected by his father in All Saints Church, Postwick, Norfolk.

Family
Primrose married Lady Victoria Stanley, daughter of Edward Stanley, 17th Earl of Derby, on 7 April 1915.
They had one daughter: Ruth Alice Hannah Mary Primrose (18 April 1916 – 1989), who married Charles Wood, 2nd Earl of Halifax, on 25 April 1936.

Lady Victoria married as her second husband Malcolm Bullock, and had one daughter, Priscilla, by him. Lady Victoria died in a hunting accident in November 1927.

Notes and references
Transcriptions

References

External links
A Primrose Path, biography by Martin Gibson / Arum Press 2020
"Captain Neil Primrose MP", pamphlet published by the Wisbech Society and Preservation Trust.

1882 births
1917 deaths
People from Midlothian
People educated at Eton College
British military personnel killed in World War I
British Army personnel of World War I
Liberal Party (UK) MPs for English constituencies
Members of the Privy Council of the United Kingdom
Recipients of the Military Cross
UK MPs 1910–1918
Younger sons of earls
Children of prime ministers of the United Kingdom
Royal Buckinghamshire Yeomanry officers
Members of London County Council
Scottish Jews
Scottish people of German-Jewish descent
Jewish British politicians
UK MPs 1910
Burials at Ramleh Commonwealth War Graves Commission Cemetery
Neil